The list of ship commissionings in 1892 includes a chronological list of all ships commissioned in 1892.



See also 

1892
 Ship commissionings